The 1917 Pittsburgh Pirates season was the 36th season of the Pittsburgh Pirates franchise; the 31st in the National League. The Pirates finished eighth and last in the league standings with a record of 51–103.

Regular season

Season standings

Record vs. opponents

Game log

|- bgcolor="ffbbbb"
| 1 || April 11 || @ Cubs || 3–5 || Vaughn || Evans (0–1) || — || — || 0–1
|- bgcolor="ffbbbb"
| 2 || April 12 || @ Cubs || 0–2 || Douglas || Cooper (0–1) || — || — || 0–2
|- bgcolor="ffbbbb"
| 3 || April 13 || @ Cubs || 1–6 || Ruether || Mamaux (0–1) || — || — || 0–3
|- bgcolor="ccffcc"
| 4 || April 14 || @ Cubs || 4–2 || Miller (1–0) || Hendrix || — || — || 1–3
|- bgcolor="ffbbbb"
| 5 || April 15 || @ Reds || 2–5 || Toney || Mamaux (0–2) || — || — || 1–4
|- bgcolor="ccffcc"
| 6 || April 16 || @ Reds || 8–4 || Cooper (1–1) || Mitchell || — || — || 2–4
|- bgcolor="ffbbbb"
| 7 || April 17 || @ Reds || 2–3 || Schneider || Miller (1–1) || — || — || 2–5
|- bgcolor="ffbbbb"
| 8 || April 18 || @ Reds || 5–7 || Eller || Mamaux (0–3) || Mitchell || — || 2–6
|- bgcolor="ffbbbb"
| 9 || April 19 || Cubs || 3–10 || Hendrix || Cooper (1–2) || — || — || 2–7
|- bgcolor="ccffcc"
| 10 || April 20 || Cubs || 6–1 || Grimes (1–0) || Demaree || — || — || 3–7
|- bgcolor="ffbbbb"
| 11 || April 21 || Cubs || 1–2 || Vaughn || Miller (1–2) || — || — || 3–8
|- bgcolor="ffbbbb"
| 12 || April 22 || @ Cardinals || 1–4 || Doak || Mamaux (0–4) || — || — || 3–9
|- bgcolor="ccffcc"
| 13 || April 23 || @ Cardinals || 2–0 || Cooper (2–2) || Watson || — || — || 4–9
|- bgcolor="ffbbbb"
| 14 || April 24 || @ Cardinals || 1–2 (10) || Ames || Grimes (1–1) || — || — || 4–10
|- bgcolor="ccffcc"
| 15 || April 25 || @ Cardinals || 10–8 (10) || Carlson (1–0) || Watson || — || — || 5–10
|- bgcolor="ffbbbb"
| 16 || April 27 || Reds || 3–5 || Toney || Miller (1–3) || — || — || 5–11
|- bgcolor="ccffcc"
| 17 || April 28 || Reds || 2–0 || Grimes (2–1) || Sanders || — || — || 6–11
|- bgcolor="ccffcc"
| 18 || April 29 || @ Reds || 3–0 || Carlson (2–0) || Schneider || — || — || 7–11
|-

|- bgcolor="ffbbbb"
| 19 || May 2 || Cardinals || 0–4 || Ames || Grimes (2–2) || — || — || 7–12
|- bgcolor="ffbbbb"
| 20 || May 3 || Cardinals || 3–4 || Pierce || Mamaux (0–5) || Doak || — || 7–13
|- bgcolor="ffbbbb"
| 21 || May 6 || @ Cubs || 2–3 || Vaughn || Carlson (2–1) || — || — || 7–14
|- bgcolor="ffbbbb"
| 22 || May 7 || @ Cubs || 1–4 || Seaton || Grimes (2–3) || — || — || 7–15
|- bgcolor="ccffcc"
| 23 || May 10 || @ Braves || 11–4 || Grimes (3–3) || Nehf || — || — || 8–15
|- bgcolor="ffbbbb"
| 24 || May 11 || @ Braves || 2–3 (10) || Rudolph || Jacobs (0–1) || — || — || 8–16
|- bgcolor="ffbbbb"
| 25 || May 14 || @ Phillies || 2–3 || Alexander || Jacobs (0–2) || — || — || 8–17
|- bgcolor="ffbbbb"
| 26 || May 15 || @ Phillies || 2–8 || Mayer || Grimes (3–4) || — || — || 8–18
|- bgcolor="ccffcc"
| 27 || May 16 || @ Phillies || 12–4 || Cooper (3–2) || Oeschger || — || — || 9–18
|- bgcolor="ffbbbb"
| 28 || May 17 || @ Phillies || 6–8 || Rixey || Carlson (2–2) || Lavender || — || 9–19
|- bgcolor="ffbbbb"
| 29 || May 18 || @ Giants || 1–8 || Sallee || Grimes (3–5) || — || — || 9–20
|- bgcolor="ccffcc"
| 30 || May 19 || @ Giants || 5–4 || Cooper (4–2) || Benton || — || — || 10–20
|- bgcolor="ffbbbb"
| 31 || May 21 || @ Giants || 3–4 || Tesreau || Jacobs (0–3) || — || — || 10–21
|- bgcolor="ccffcc"
| 32 || May 22 || @ Giants || 2–0 || Miller (2–3) || Anderson || — || — || 11–21
|- bgcolor="ffbbbb"
| 33 || May 24 || @ Robins || 0–6 || Pfeffer || Grimes (3–6) || — || — || 11–22
|- bgcolor="ffbbbb"
| 34 || May 25 || @ Robins || 3–4 || Cadore || Cooper (4–3) || — || — || 11–23
|- bgcolor="ffbbbb"
| 35 || May 26 || @ Robins || 1–4 || Marquard || Miller (2–4) || — || — || 11–24
|- bgcolor="ffbbbb"
| 36 || May 30 || Cubs || 5–6 || Douglas || Jacobs (0–4) || Demaree || — || 11–25
|- bgcolor="ccffcc"
| 37 || May 30 || Cubs || 2–1 || Carlson (3–2) || Demaree || — || — || 12–25
|- bgcolor="ccffcc"
| 38 || May 31 || Phillies || 3–2 || Mamaux (1–5) || Rixey || Jacobs (1) || — || 13–25
|-

|- bgcolor="ffbbbb"
| 39 || June 1 || Phillies || 1–9 || Mayer || Miller (2–5) || — || — || 13–26
|- bgcolor="ffbbbb"
| 40 || June 2 || Phillies || 1–9 || Alexander || Grimes (3–7) || — || — || 13–27
|- bgcolor="ccffcc"
| 41 || June 4 || Phillies || 5–1 || Jacobs (1–4) || Lavender || — || — || 14–27
|- bgcolor="ffbbbb"
| 42 || June 7 || Robins || 3–5 || Pfeffer || Mamaux (1–6) || — || — || 14–28
|- bgcolor="ccffcc"
| 43 || June 8 || Robins || 5–4 || Miller (3–5) || Dell || — || — || 15–28
|- bgcolor="ffbbbb"
| 44 || June 9 || Braves || 5–6 || Tyler || Carlson (3–3) || — || — || 15–29
|- bgcolor="ffbbbb"
| 45 || June 11 || Braves || 0–2 || Nehf || Miller (3–6) || Tyler || — || 15–30
|- bgcolor="ccffcc"
| 46 || June 12 || Braves || 5–4 (11) || Jacobs (2–4) || Tyler || — || — || 16–30
|- bgcolor="ffbbbb"
| 47 || June 13 || Giants || 3–7 || Anderson || Grimes (3–8) || — || — || 16–31
|- bgcolor="ffbbbb"
| 48 || June 14 || Giants || 0–2 || Perritt || Jacobs (2–5) || — || — || 16–32
|- bgcolor="ffbbbb"
| 49 || June 16 || Giants || 1–4 || Benton || Miller (3–7) || — || — || 16–33
|- bgcolor="ccffcc"
| 50 || June 18 || @ Cardinals || 4–0 || Cooper (5–3) || Packard || — || — || 17–33
|- bgcolor="ccffcc"
| 51 || June 19 || @ Cardinals || 7–3 (11) || Jacobs (3–5) || Ames || — || — || 18–33
|- bgcolor="ffffff"
| 52 || June 20 || @ Cardinals || 4–4 (6) ||  ||  || — || — || 18–33
|- bgcolor="ffbbbb"
| 53 || June 21 || Cubs || 4–12 || Seaton || Miller (3–8) || — || — || 18–34
|- bgcolor="ccffcc"
| 54 || June 22 || Cubs || 4–3 (10) || Cooper (6–3) || Demaree || — || — || 19–34
|- bgcolor="ffbbbb"
| 55 || June 23 || Cubs || 0–2 || Douglas || Jacobs (3–6) || — || — || 19–35
|- bgcolor="ffbbbb"
| 56 || June 23 || Cubs || 4–6 (10) || Hendrix || Miller (3–9) || Seaton || — || 19–36
|- bgcolor="ffbbbb"
| 57 || June 24 || @ Cubs || 1–2 || Vaughn || Mamaux (1–7) || — || — || 19–37
|- bgcolor="ffbbbb"
| 58 || June 26 || Reds || 5–6 || Schneider || Cooper (6–4) || — || — || 19–38
|- bgcolor="ffbbbb"
| 59 || June 27 || Reds || 5–6 || Regan || Jacobs (3–7) || Ring || — || 19–39
|- bgcolor="ccffcc"
| 60 || June 28 || Reds || 6–2 || Steele (1–0) || Toney || — || — || 20–39
|- bgcolor="ffbbbb"
| 61 || June 29 || Reds || 0–1 || Mitchell || Mamaux (1–8) || — || — || 20–40
|- bgcolor="ccffcc"
| 62 || June 30 || Reds || 5–4 || Cooper (7–4) || Ring || — || — || 21–40
|-

|- bgcolor="ffbbbb"
| 63 || July 1 || @ Reds || 1–4 || Toney || Jacobs (3–8) || — || — || 21–41
|- bgcolor="ffbbbb"
| 64 || July 1 || @ Reds || 1–5 || Toney || Steele (1–1) || — || — || 21–42
|- bgcolor="ffbbbb"
| 65 || July 2 || Cardinals || 4–6 || Horstmann || Mamaux (1–9) || Packard || — || 21–43
|- bgcolor="ffbbbb"
| 66 || July 3 || Cardinals || 6–8 || Ames || Miller (3–10) || — || — || 21–44
|- bgcolor="ffbbbb"
| 67 || July 4 || Cardinals || 3–4 || Packard || Jacobs (3–9) || Meadows || — || 21–45
|- bgcolor="ffbbbb"
| 68 || July 4 || Cardinals || 1–4 || Doak || Cooper (7–5) || — || — || 21–46
|- bgcolor="ffbbbb"
| 69 || July 5 || Cardinals || 6–9 (11) || Ames || Grimes (3–9) || — || — || 21–47
|- bgcolor="ccffcc"
| 70 || July 6 || @ Phillies || 8–5 || Mamaux (2–9) || Oeschger || Carlson (1) || — || 22–47
|- bgcolor="ccffcc"
| 71 || July 7 || @ Phillies || 4–1 || Miller (4–10) || Alexander || Jacobs (2) || — || 23–47
|- bgcolor="ccffcc"
| 72 || July 12 || @ Robins || 2–1 || Carlson (4–3) || Pfeffer || — || — || 24–47
|- bgcolor="ffbbbb"
| 73 || July 13 || @ Robins || 0–4 || Cheney || Jacobs (3–10) || — || — || 24–48
|- bgcolor="ffbbbb"
| 74 || July 13 || @ Robins || 1–2 (10) || Smith || Grimes (3–10) || — || — || 24–49
|- bgcolor="ffbbbb"
| 75 || July 14 || @ Robins || 3–5 || Coombs || Mamaux (2–10) || — || — || 24–50
|- bgcolor="ffbbbb"
| 76 || July 14 || @ Robins || 0–1 || Marquard || Miller (4–11) || — || — || 24–51
|- bgcolor="ffbbbb"
| 77 || July 16 || @ Braves || 7–8 (11) || Tyler || Grimes (3–11) || — || — || 24–52
|- bgcolor="ffbbbb"
| 78 || July 16 || @ Braves || 2–7 || Barnes || Jacobs (3–11) || — || — || 24–53
|- bgcolor="ffbbbb"
| 79 || July 17 || @ Braves || 6–10 || Nehf || Mamaux (2–11) || — || — || 24–54
|- bgcolor="ccffcc"
| 80 || July 18 || @ Braves || 8–6 || Steele (2–1) || Tyler || — || — || 25–54
|- bgcolor="ccffcc"
| 81 || July 18 || @ Braves || 3–2 || Carlson (5–3) || Rudolph || — || — || 26–54
|- bgcolor="ccffcc"
| 82 || July 19 || @ Braves || 6–1 || Cooper (8–5) || Barnes || — || — || 27–54
|- bgcolor="ffbbbb"
| 83 || July 20 || @ Giants || 0–4 || Benton || Carlson (5–4) || — || — || 27–55
|- bgcolor="ffbbbb"
| 84 || July 21 || @ Giants || 3–4 (10) || Sallee || Grimes (3–12) || — || — || 27–56
|- bgcolor="ccffcc"
| 85 || July 23 || @ Giants || 1–0 || Cooper (9–5) || Schupp || — || — || 28–56
|- bgcolor="ffbbbb"
| 86 || July 24 || @ Giants || 2–6 || Perritt || Miller (4–12) || Anderson || — || 28–57
|- bgcolor="ffbbbb"
| 87 || July 25 || Robins || 3–4 (13) || Smith || Jacobs (3–12) || — || — || 28–58
|- bgcolor="ccffcc"
| 88 || July 26 || Robins || 4–1 || Carlson (6–4) || Pfeffer || — || — || 29–58
|- bgcolor="ffbbbb"
| 89 || July 26 || Robins || 1–5 || Cadore || Jacobs (3–13) || — || — || 29–59
|- bgcolor="ccffcc"
| 90 || July 27 || Robins || 5–1 || Cooper (10–5) || Coombs || — || — || 30–59
|- bgcolor="ffbbbb"
| 91 || July 28 || Robins || 2–6 || Cheney || Steele (2–2) || — || — || 30–60
|- bgcolor="ffbbbb"
| 92 || July 28 || Robins || 2–4 || Smith || Miller (4–13) || — || — || 30–61
|- bgcolor="ccffcc"
| 93 || July 30 || Giants || 4–3 || Carlson (7–4) || Anderson || Cooper (1) || — || 31–61
|- bgcolor="ffbbbb"
| 94 || July 31 || Giants || 7–11 || Tesreau || Cooper (10–6) || — || — || 31–62
|- bgcolor="ffbbbb"
| 95 || July 31 || Giants || 3–9 || Schupp || Grimes (3–13) || — || — || 31–63
|-

|- bgcolor="ffbbbb"
| 96 || August 1 || Giants || 1–3 || Perritt || Steele (2–3) || — || — || 31–64
|- bgcolor="ffbbbb"
| 97 || August 2 || Giants || 3–7 || Demaree || Miller (4–14) || — || — || 31–65
|- bgcolor="ffbbbb"
| 98 || August 3 || Braves || 4–5 || Nehf || Carlson (7–5) || — || — || 31–66
|- bgcolor="ffbbbb"
| 99 || August 4 || Braves || 3–6 || Tyler || Steele (2–4) || — || — || 31–67
|- bgcolor="ccffcc"
| 100 || August 9 || Phillies || 5–1 || Jacobs (4–13) || Alexander || — || — || 32–67
|- bgcolor="ccffcc"
| 101 || August 10 || Phillies || 1–0 || Cooper (11–6) || Rixey || — || — || 33–67
|- bgcolor="ffbbbb"
| 102 || August 11 || Phillies || 3–4 || Alexander || Miller (4–15) || — || — || 33–68
|- bgcolor="ffbbbb"
| 103 || August 11 || Phillies || 2–3 || Oeschger || Evans (0–2) || — || — || 33–69
|- bgcolor="ffbbbb"
| 104 || August 12 || @ Cubs || 2–3 || Vaughn || Carlson (7–6) || — || — || 33–70
|- bgcolor="ffbbbb"
| 105 || August 13 || @ Cubs || 3–7 || Hendrix || Steele (2–5) || — || — || 33–71
|- bgcolor="ccffcc"
| 106 || August 14 || @ Cubs || 2–0 (12) || Cooper (12–6) || Douglas || — || — || 34–71
|- bgcolor="ccffcc"
| 107 || August 15 || Reds || 3–2 || Miller (5–15) || Schneider || — || — || 35–71
|- bgcolor="ffbbbb"
| 108 || August 16 || @ Phillies || 3–5 || Oeschger || Jacobs (4–14) || — || — || 35–72
|- bgcolor="ffbbbb"
| 109 || August 16 || @ Phillies || 0–3 || Mayer || Evans (0–3) || — || — || 35–73
|- bgcolor="ffbbbb"
| 110 || August 17 || @ Phillies || 0–3 || Bender || Jacobs (4–15) || — || — || 35–74
|- bgcolor="ffbbbb"
| 111 || August 17 || @ Phillies || 3–7 || Rixey || Carlson (7–7) || — || — || 35–75
|- bgcolor="ffbbbb"
| 112 || August 18 || @ Phillies || 2–3 (14) || Alexander || Cooper (12–7) || — || — || 35–76
|- bgcolor="ccffcc"
| 113 || August 20 || @ Robins || 1–0 (10) || Miller (6–15) || Marquard || — || — || 36–76
|- bgcolor="ffffff"
| 114 || August 21 || @ Robins || 3–3 (13) ||  ||  || — || — || 36–76
|- bgcolor="ffbbbb"
| 115 || August 22 || @ Robins || 5–6 (22) || Marquard || Jacobs (4–16) || — || — || 36–77
|- bgcolor="ffbbbb"
| 116 || August 23 || @ Braves || 1–2 || Tyler || Grimes (3–14) || — || — || 36–78
|- bgcolor="ccffcc"
| 117 || August 24 || @ Braves || 1–0 || Miller (7–15) || Barnes || — || — || 37–78
|- bgcolor="ffbbbb"
| 118 || August 25 || @ Braves || 0–2 || Ragan || Steele (2–6) || — || — || 37–79
|- bgcolor="ccffcc"
| 119 || August 27 || @ Giants || 1–0 || Cooper (13–7) || Benton || — || — || 38–79
|- bgcolor="ffbbbb"
| 120 || August 28 || @ Giants || 3–7 || Perritt || Grimes (3–15) || — || — || 38–80
|- bgcolor="ffbbbb"
| 121 || August 29 || @ Giants || 5–6 || Tesreau || Miller (7–16) || Sallee || — || 38–81
|- bgcolor="ccffcc"
| 122 || August 31 || Cardinals || 2–0 || Jacobs (5–16) || Doak || — || — || 39–81
|- bgcolor="ffbbbb"
| 123 || August 31 || Cardinals || 0–1 (5) || Ames || Steele (2–7) || — || — || 39–82
|-

|- bgcolor="ffbbbb"
| 124 || September 1 || Cardinals || 0–1 || Horstmann || Cooper (13–8) || — || — || 39–83
|- bgcolor="ffbbbb"
| 125 || September 1 || Cardinals || 0–1 || Watson || Carlson (7–8) || — || — || 39–84
|- bgcolor="ccffcc"
| 126 || September 2 || @ Reds || 8–7 || Steele (3–7) || Mitchell || — || — || 40–84
|- bgcolor="ccffcc"
| 127 || September 3 || Reds || 8–0 || Miller (8–16) || Engel || — || — || 41–84
|- bgcolor="ccffcc"
| 128 || September 3 || Reds || 5–3 || Steele (4–7) || Schneider || — || — || 42–84
|- bgcolor="ccffcc"
| 129 || September 4 || Reds || 5–4 (10) || Cooper (14–8) || Toney || — || — || 43–84
|- bgcolor="ffbbbb"
| 130 || September 7 || Cubs || 1–2 || Carter || Steele (4–8) || — || — || 43–85
|- bgcolor="ffbbbb"
| 131 || September 8 || Cubs || 2–6 || Vaughn || Miller (8–17) || — || — || 43–86
|- bgcolor="ffbbbb"
| 132 || September 9 || @ Cubs || 0–1 || Douglas || Cooper (14–9) || — || — || 43–87
|- bgcolor="ffbbbb"
| 133 || September 10 || @ Cardinals || 1–2 || Goodwin || Jacobs (5–17) || — || — || 43–88
|- bgcolor="ccffcc"
| 134 || September 11 || @ Cardinals || 3–0 || Steele (5–8) || Doak || — || — || 44–88
|- bgcolor="ffbbbb"
| 135 || September 11 || @ Cardinals || 2–5 || Horstmann || Carlson (7–9) || — || — || 44–89
|- bgcolor="ccffcc"
| 136 || September 12 || @ Cardinals || 2–1 || Miller (9–17) || Watson || — || — || 45–89
|- bgcolor="ccffcc"
| 137 || September 13 || @ Cardinals || 2–1 || Cooper (15–9) || Meadows || — || — || 46–89
|- bgcolor="ffbbbb"
| 138 || September 15 || @ Reds || 6–7 || Eller || Grimes (3–16) || — || — || 46–90
|- bgcolor="ffbbbb"
| 139 || September 16 || @ Reds || 2–4 || Schneider || Steele (5–9) || — || — || 46–91
|- bgcolor="ffbbbb"
| 140 || September 16 || @ Reds || 2–3 || Regan || Carlson (7–10) || — || — || 46–92
|- bgcolor="ffbbbb"
| 141 || September 17 || Braves || 1–4 (15) || Hughes || Miller (9–18) || — || — || 46–93
|- bgcolor="ffbbbb"
| 142 || September 18 || Braves || 3–5 || Rudolph || Cooper (15–10) || — || — || 46–94
|- bgcolor="ffbbbb"
| 143 || September 18 || Braves || 0–1 || Nehf || Ponder (0–1) || — || — || 46–95
|- bgcolor="ccffcc"
| 144 || September 19 || Braves || 2–1 || Jacobs (6–17) || Barnes || — || — || 47–95
|- bgcolor="ffbbbb"
| 145 || September 19 || Braves || 4–6 || Scott || Evans (0–4) || — || — || 47–96
|- bgcolor="ffffff"
| 146 || September 20 || Giants || 9–9 (10) ||  ||  || — || — || 47–96
|- bgcolor="ffbbbb"
| 147 || September 21 || Giants || 1–3 || Benton || Steele (5–10) || Anderson || — || 47–97
|- bgcolor="ffbbbb"
| 148 || September 22 || Giants || 1–2 (11) || Perritt || Cooper (15–11) || — || — || 47–98
|- bgcolor="ccffcc"
| 149 || September 22 || Giants || 1–0 || Ponder (1–1) || Demaree || — || — || 48–98
|- bgcolor="ffbbbb"
| 150 || September 24 || Phillies || 0–2 || Bender || Jacobs (6–18) || — || — || 48–99
|- bgcolor="ccffcc"
| 151 || September 25 || Phillies || 3–0 || Miller (10–18) || Oeschger || — || — || 49–99
|- bgcolor="ffbbbb"
| 152 || September 26 || Phillies || 0–5 || Rixey || Carlson (7–11) || — || — || 49–100
|- bgcolor="ccffcc"
| 153 || September 27 || Robins || 10–2 || Cooper (16–11) || Pfeffer || — || — || 50–100
|- bgcolor="ffbbbb"
| 154 || September 28 || Robins || 1–3 || Smith || Steele (5–11) || — || — || 50–101
|- bgcolor="ffbbbb"
| 155 || September 29 || Robins || 2–3 || Cadore || Jacobs (6–19) || — || — || 50–102
|- bgcolor="ffbbbb"
| 156 || September 29 || Robins || 3–7 || Marquard || Miller (10–19) || — || — || 50–103
|-

|- bgcolor="ccffcc"
| 157 || October 1 || Braves || 2–0 || Cooper (17–11) || Scott || — || — || 51–103
|-

|-
| Legend:       = Win       = Loss       = TieBold = Pirates team member

Opening Day lineup

Roster

Player stats

Batting

Starters by position 
Note: Pos = Position; G = Games played; AB = At bats; H = Hits; Avg. = Batting average; HR = Home runs; RBI = Runs batted in

Other batters 
Note: G = Games played; AB = At bats; H = Hits; Avg. = Batting average; HR = Home runs; RBI = Runs batted in

Pitching

Starting pitchers 
Note: G = Games pitched; IP = Innings pitched; W = Wins; L = Losses; ERA = Earned run average; SO = Strikeouts

Other pitchers 
Note: G = Games pitched; IP = Innings pitched; W = Wins; L = Losses; ERA = Earned run average; SO = Strikeouts

References

External links
 1917 Pittsburgh Pirates team page at Baseball Reference
 1917 Pittsburgh Pirates Page at Baseball Almanac

Pittsburgh Pirates seasons
Pittsburgh Pirates season
Pitts